Crow was a 36-gun fourth rate vessel captured from the French by the English, She was captured on 9 September 1652 as the 36-gun Le Croissant. She was commissioned into the Parliamentary Naval Force as Crow. She was sold 1656.

Crow was the only named vessel in the English or Royal Navy.

Specifications
Her dimensional data is unknown. Her gun armament was 36 guns. Her manning was 140 personnel.

Commissioned Service

Service in the English Civil War and Commonwealth Navy
She was commissioned into the Parliamentary Navy in 1653 under the command of Captain Thomas Thompson until 1654. She was placed in ordinary in 1654,

Disposition
Crow was sold 1656.

Notes

Citations

References

 British Warships in the Age of Sail (1603 – 1714), by Rif Winfield, published by Seaforth Publishing, England © Rif Winfield 2009, EPUB , Chapter 4 Fourth Rates - 'Small Ships', Vessels acquired from 25 March 1603, Ex-French Prizes (1650-52), Crow
 Ships of the Royal Navy, by J.J. Colledge, revised and updated by Lt-Cdr Ben Warlow and Steve Bush, published by Seaforth Publishing, Barnsley, Great Britain, © the estate of J.J. Colledge, Ben Warlow and Steve Bush 2020, EPUB , Section C (Crow)
 The Arming and Fitting of English Ships of War 1600 - 1815, by Brian Lavery, published by US Naval Institute Press © Brian Lavery 1989, Part V Guns, Type of Guns

Ships of the line of the Royal Navy
1650s ships
Ships of the English navy